The banded demoiselle (Calopteryx splendens) is a species of damselfly belonging to the family Calopterygidae. It is often found along slow-flowing streams and rivers. It is a Eurasian species occurring from the Atlantic coast eastwards to Lake Baikal and northwestern China.

This is a common species throughout much of its range.

Description

Male and female are variable in color and pattern. The male has translucent wings which each have a broad, dark iridescent blue-black spot (or band) across the outer part. On immature individuals the spot is dark brown. The body can be a metallic blue or bluish green or a combination of both colours, depending on the time of year and location.

The dark wing patch of the male starts at the nodus (the slight dip midway down the upper edge of the wing) but can reach up to the wing-tip in southern races. In the very similar beautiful demoiselle (Calopteryx virgo), the dark patch starts before the nodus.

The female has translucent, pale green iridescent wings with a white patch near the tip (a pseudopterostigma), and a metallic green or bronze/green body.

Eggs and larvae

Females can lay up to 10 eggs per minute for 45 minutes. They lay in a wide variety of emergent or floating plants, sometimes even submerging to do so.

The eggs hatch after 14 days. The larvae have very long legs and are stick-shaped. They develop over two years, usually. They tolerate muddy water and overwinter buried in mud. When they are ready to moult into an adult, they climb up a suitable reed or plant and shed their skin.

Habitat

This species lives in many types of freshwater habitat, particularly open running water bodies such as streams and smaller rivers.

Behaviour

Males are usually territorial, but large numbers can sometimes be found in lush bankside plants and on floating objects. They court females by opening their wings and performing an aerial dance. They are usually found in canals and quiet rivers with muddy bottoms located in open country.

Range
The banded demoiselle is a Eurasian species, and is present throughout Eurasia from the Atlantic coast to Lake Baikal and north-western China. It occurs in Taganay and Zyuratkul National Parks of Russia. It can be found at Fruška Gora in Serbia. It's found throughout the British Isles, except for the Scottish Highlands.

Gallery

Footnotes and references

Further reading

 Hämäläinen, M. (2008) Calopteryx splendens (Harris, 1780) – a note on the publication date of the description of the Banded Demoiselle Journal of the British Dragonfly Society 24(1): 19-23
 Richard Gabb – Banded Demoiselle – Calopteryx splendens – European Dragonfly Photographs

Calopterygidae
Odonata of Asia
Damselflies of Europe
Insects described in 1780
Taxa named by Moses Harris
Articles containing video clips